Blangy-sur-Ternoise (literally Blangy on Ternoise) is a commune in the Pas-de-Calais department in the Hauts-de-France region in northern France.

Geography
Situated some 9 miles(15 km) northwest of Saint-Pol-sur-Ternoise, on the D94 road.

Population

Personalities
Saint Bertha of Artois, established a convent at Blangy and died here in 725.

See also
Communes of the Pas-de-Calais department

References

Communes of Pas-de-Calais
Artois